Philanthus coarctatus raptor, the robber philanthus, is a subspecies of bee-hunting wasp (or "beewolf") from Algeria and other parts of Northern Africa.

References

Crabronidae
Hymenoptera of Africa
Taxa named by Amédée Louis Michel le Peletier